The Tupolev ANT-7, known by the VVS as the Tupolev R-6 ( R – razvedchik – reconnaissance), was a reconnaissance aircraft and escort fighter of the Soviet Union. The R-6 traces its roots back to early 1928 when the Soviet Air Force needed  a long-range multirole aircraft. The requirements were that it could be used for long-range transport, defensive patrolling, reconnaissance, light bombing and torpedo attack.

Design and development
Under Ivan Pogosski and guided by Andrei Tupolev, TsAGI developed the ANT-7 from the Tupolev TB-1 by scaling it down by about one third. Power for the ANT-7 was intended to be provided by two  –  Hispano Suiza engines or   Bristol Jupiter engines, but the prototype was powered by two  –  BMW VI engines.

The first flight of the ANT-7 took place on 11 September 1929, piloted by Mikhail Gromov. Flight tests started in March 1930 after TsAGi decided to postpone them until after the winter. That summer, the NII-VVS (Nauchno-Issledovatel'skiy Institut Voyenno-Vozdooshnykh Seel – air force scientific test institute) conducted state tests which revealed tailplane buffeting, which was alleviated by fitting enlarged elevators. The next flight encountered radiator damage and an engine failure, but in spite of this, the  ANT-7 passed the state acceptance tests.

Operational history
Production aircraft were designated  R-6 by the Soviet Air Force. The first production aircraft was rolled off the GAZ-22, (GAZ – Gosudarstvenny Aviatsionnyy Zavod – state aviation plant/factory), assembly line in November 1931, a year after production started. Another 410 aircraft were made during the following three years: 385 at GAZ-22 in Moscow (one of these was the R-6 Limuzin), five at GAZ-31 in Taganrog (floatplanes designated KR-6P), and 20 more at GAZ-12 in Komsomolsk-on-Amur.

Some were built with floats as the MP-6, (also known as KR-6P), for maritime patrol duties. Another variant was the KR-6 (KR – Kreiser Razveyedchik – cruiser reconnaissance), which had two PV-2 machine guns and a second gunner, that was later relegated to training duties.

By 1935, the R-6 was becoming obsolete, and several were transferred to Aeroflot and Avia Arktika, which used them to carry passengers and cargo in Siberia before the Great Patriotic War, designated PS-7-2M17 (the "2M17" showed that the aircraft were powered by two Mikulin M-17s), or as MP-6-2M17 if  floats were attached.

Variants
ANT-7The OKB designation of the project and prototype, powered by two  BMW VI V-12 engines.
R-6(R – Razvyedchik – reconnaissance) reconnaissance version, powered by two  Mikulin M-17F V-12 engines. first flight 1929, trials 1930.
KR-6(KR – Kreiser Razvyedchik – cruiser reconnaissance) escort fighter version 1934, powered by two  Mikulin M-17 V-12 engines, fitted with two PV-2 machine guns and a second gunner.
KR-6PAlternative designation of the MR-6 floatplane version.
MP-6 2M-17(Morskoj Paassazhirskii – seaplane passenger transport) Civil floatplane version, powered by two  Mikulin M-17 V-12 engines..
PS-7 2M-17(Paassazhirskii – passenger transport) Civil transport version PS-7 2M-17, cargo and passenger transport, first versions open cockpit, one version enclosed.
MR-6(Morskoj razvyedchik – maritime reconnaissance) R-6, torpedo bomber version, 1932.
P-6(Paassazhirskii – passenger transport) Civil cargo and passenger transport version.
R-6 LimuzinNine-seat civil transport version with a closed cockpit and a seven-seat cabin with glass windows and a luggage compartment. Powered by two  BMW VI V-12 engines. First flown in July 1933, the sole R-6L crashed on 5 September 1933 as a result of a maintenance error.
ANT-18Ground attack version with two Mikulin M-34 engines, armor protection, and two dorsally-mounted machine guns.

Operators
Military operators

Soviet Air Force
Soviet Naval Aviation

Civil operators

Aeroflot
Avia Arktika

Accidents and incidents
June 23, 1941: A Dalstroi Aviation PS-7 crashed on takeoff from Chokurdakh after the left float struck a submerged log; all five on board survived, but the aircraft was written off.
October 19, 1943: A Dalstroi Aviation PS-7 crashed on takeoff from Zyryanka owing to improper luggage loading caused by crew error; all 12 on board survived, but the aircraft was written off.

Specifications (R-6)

See also

References

Bibliography
 Duffy, Paul & Kandalov, Andrei. (1996) Tupolev, The Man and His Aircraft. Warrendale, Pennsylvania: Society of Automotive Engineers. 
 
 
 

 

1920s Soviet and Russian military reconnaissance aircraft
ANT-07
World War II Soviet reconnaissance aircraft
Aircraft first flown in 1929
Twin piston-engined tractor aircraft